Cherrelle Fennell (born ) was a British female artistic gymnast, representing her nation at international competitions.

She participated at the 2004 Summer Olympics.

References

External links

1986 births
Living people
British female artistic gymnasts
Place of birth missing (living people)
Gymnasts at the 2004 Summer Olympics
Olympic gymnasts of Great Britain